Sheds is a hamlet in Madison County, New York, United States. Sheds had a post office until January 23, 1993.

References

Hamlets in Madison County, New York
Hamlets in New York (state)